HDA may refer to:

Computing
 Intel High Definition Audio
 OPC Historical Data Access
 , see Device file § Naming conventions
 Head and Disk Assembly of a Winchester disk

Science and mathematics
 Helicase-dependent amplification
 High density amorphous ice
 Higher-dimensional algebra

Other uses
 Dragonair
 Ein Shemer Airfield
 Hockey Diversity Alliance
 The Holy Demon Army
 Huntington's Disease Association